Big Creek is a stream in Sauk County, Wisconsin, in the United States.

Big Creek was named from its relatively large size.

See also
List of rivers of Wisconsin

References

Rivers of Sauk County, Wisconsin
Rivers of Wisconsin